Ferhan Çeçen (born June 15, 1961) is a Turkish environmental engineer and chemist researching wastewater treatment, environmental biotechnology, and adsorption processes. She is a professor at the Boğaziçi University Institute of Environmental Sciences.

Early life and education 
Ferhan Çeçen was born on June 15, 1961 in Istanbul, Turkey. She graduated from the Deutsche Schule Istanbul in 1980 and speaks fluent English and German in addition to her native Turkish. Çeçen completed a B.S. in chemical engineering at Boğaziçi University in 1984.

In 1986, Çeçen completed a M.S. in environmental engineering at the Istanbul Technical University (ITU). Her Master's thesis was titled Metal Complexation and its Implications on related Technologies.

Çeçen earned a Ph.D. in environmental engineering at ITU in 1990. Her dissertation was titled Nitrogen Removal from High-strength Wastewaters by Upflow Submerged Nitrification and Denitrification Filters.

Career and research 
In November 1990, Çeçen joined the faculty at the Boğaziçi University Institute of Environmental Sciences as an instructor. She was promoted to assistant professor in March 1993, associate professor in October 1993, and full professor in June 1999.

Çeçen researches water and wastewater treatment, environmental biotechnology, adsorption processes, and the impacts of hazardous substances on biological treatment.

Selected works

References

External links 

 

Living people
1961 births
Engineers from Istanbul
Deutsche Schule Istanbul alumni
Boğaziçi University alumni
Academic staff of Boğaziçi University
Istanbul Technical University alumni
Turkish women chemists
Turkish chemists
Turkish engineering academics
Turkish environmental engineers
Environmental chemistry
20th-century women engineers
21st-century women engineers